Siriththiran was popular monthly Tamil magazine published in Sri Lanka. It started publishing in 1963 in Colombo. Then it was shifted to Jaffna in 1971 and continued there until 1987. The founder and first editor of the magazine was C. Sivanganasundaram. Also known as Siriththiran Sunthar among the Tamil literates, he started his career as a cartoonist.

Siriththiran stopped publishing during the 1987 war between the Liberation Tigers of Tamil Eelam and the Indian Peace Keeping Force and started again in Jaffna during the 1990s and continued until 1995. The magazine has released 318 volumes. It contained stories, short stories, novels, and cartoons.

From the beginning, the magazines were printed at Suthanthiran Printers located in Bandaranayake Street in Colombo. Then, in 1970 it was shifted to Kumaran Printers located in St. Benedict Street. In 1971, it started printing in Sri Lanka Printers located at 67, Brown Street, Jaffna. In 1974 it was shifted to Navalar Street.

References

 Cartoon Ulagil Naan. Malligaippanthal publications.

Defunct magazines published in Sri Lanka
Magazines established in 1963
Magazines disestablished in 1995
Mass media in Colombo
Mass media in Jaffna
Monthly magazines
Magazines published in Sri Lanka
Tamil-language magazines
Defunct literary magazines